Jim Duncan (Alaska politician) (born May 4, 1942) Muscatine, Iowa. Alaskan state and local officeholder, educator and government and union executive.

Early life and Education
Duncan was born to Paul and Hazel Duncan in Muscatine, Iowa on the Mississippi River.
Duncan graduated from Rockridge High School in Taylor Ridge, Illinois in 1960, and received an A.A. from Sheldon Jackson College, in Sitka, Alaska in 1962; attended Seattle University and got a B.A. degree from Illinois State University in 1965, and a master's degree in Business Administration from Oregon State University, in 1970.

Career
Duncan was an accountant and taught at Sheldon Jackson, Sitka (Islands) Community College, and the Juneau-Douglas Community College.

He was the controller for the tribal Tlingit-Haida Regional Housing Authority. He was a supervisor in Alaska's Department of Revenue, the Commissioner of Administration during the Tony Knowles governorship, and was the Business Manager of the Alaska State Employees Association, an AFSCME affiliate, the state's largest union.

From 1972 to 1974, Duncan was appointed and elected as a member of the City and Borough Assembly Juneau in Alaska. He was a Democrat party candidate for Alaska U.S. Representative in the general election of 1998, running against incumbent Representative Don Young, who was then in his 13th term.

Duncan was the Executive Director of the Alaska State Employees Association, an AFSCME affiliate, the state's largest union, from February 2003 through December 2017.

Tenure
Duncan served on the Juneau-Douglas Borough Assembly, in the Alaska House of Representatives 1975-1986 (Speaker, 1981–1982), and Alaska Senate 1987–1998, including a term as Minority Leader. He was Alaska's 1998 Democratic congressional candidate, running against incumbent Representative Don Young, who was then in his 13th term.

Personal
Jim and his wife Carol Jean Acevada, who was a Tlingit tribal member, business owner and educator from Kake, Alaska had seven children: Jim Jr., Desiree, Michelle, Derek, Jon, Marc, Caron, and, by his second wife Charlotte, stepdaughter Kathy.

References 

1942 births
20th-century American politicians
Borough assembly members in Alaska
Democratic Party Alaska state senators
Oregon State University alumni
Educators from Alaska
Living people
People from Muscatine, Iowa
People from Sitka, Alaska
People from Juneau, Alaska
People from Anchorage, Alaska
Speakers of the Alaska House of Representatives
Democratic Party members of the Alaska House of Representatives